Izabella Alvarez (born March 1, 2004) is an American actress known for her roles in television shows such as Shameless, Westworld, and Walk the Prank. She plays Vera in the Disney+ film Magic Camp. Her most recent role is the voice of Ronalda "Ronnie Anne" Santiago in the Nickelodeon animated series The Loud House, its 2021 film, and its spin-off installment, The Casagrandes.

Career
Alvarez began acting at the age of six. Her first role was in a retail television commercial with her family. Since that time, she has played roles for film and television.

Her first recurring role was that of Sarah in Season 4 of Shameless. Alvarez was cast as a regular in the 2017 made-for-television film Raised by Wolves where she played Dolly Gabel, the daughter of Sheila Gabel (Georgia King). She is also cast as Vera in the 2020 film Magic Camp.

Additional recurring roles include on Splitting Up Together, Westworld, and Walk the Prank.

In 2019, Alvarez provided the voice of Ronalda "Ronnie Anne" Santiago in The Loud House and its spin-off series The Casagrandes where the role was previously voiced by Breanna Yde.

Filmography

Film

Television

Awards and nominations

References

External links
 Official website 
 

2004 births
Living people
Actresses from California
American child actresses
American television actresses
American voice actresses
Hispanic and Latino American actresses
21st-century American actresses
American people of Mexican descent